Mike Duhaney (born April 5, 1974) is an American retired professional soccer player who played in Major League Soccer (MLS) and the 2. Bundesliga. He was the 1997 Major League Soccer Rookie of the Year.

Career
Duhaney played college soccer at the University of Nevada, Las Vegas from 1992 to 1994, where he was named first-team All-Conference in 1994. Upon graduating in 1994, he spent all of 1995 training full-time with the U.S. U-23 Olympic team. He also played four games for the U.S. team at the 1995 Pan American Games.

Duhaney was selected eighty-seventh overall in the 1996 MLS Inaugural Player Draft by the Tampa Bay Mutiny. He lost the entire 1996 season due to a knee injury. In 1997, he seized the Mutiny's left back position and started twenty-five games, earning MLS Rookie of the Year.

In June 1998, Duhaney was traded midway into the next season to the MetroStars in exchange for Paul Dougherty after the MetroStars backline was decimated by injuries. Although he saw a good deal of playing time with the Metros, he never settled in.

On January 28, 2000, was traded to the Columbus Crew in exchange for Thomas Dooley. Duhaney stayed in Columbus for two years, starting thirty-nine games for the team, but decided not to return after the 2001 season.

In 2002, Duhaney signed with 2. Bundesliga team 1. FSV Mainz 05.

Honors
Individual
 MLS Rookie of the Year: 1997

References

External links

MetroStars player profile

1974 births
Living people
American soccer players
Soccer players from San Diego
Association football defenders
United States men's under-23 international soccer players
Major League Soccer players
UNLV Rebels men's soccer players
Tampa Bay Mutiny players
New York Red Bulls players
Columbus Crew players
1. FSV Mainz 05 players
2. Bundesliga players
American expatriate soccer players
Expatriate footballers in Germany